Brixey Creek (also spelled Brixy Creek) is a stream in Ozark County, Missouri. It is a tributary of Spring Creek. The headwaters of Brixey Creek are southwest of the community of Brixey. The stream flows to the northeast past Brixey and parallels Missouri Route N passing under Route N and Missouri Route 95 just south and east of their intersection. The stream flows north parallel to Route N to its confluence with Spring Creek just east of Rockbridge.

Brixey Creek has the name of the local  family.

See also
List of rivers of Missouri

References

Rivers of Ozark County, Missouri
Rivers of Missouri